Georgia Evans may refer to:
 Georgia Evans (footballer)
 Georgia Evans (rugby union)